The NWA United States Junior Heavyweight Championship was a National Wrestling Alliance (NWA) sanctioned professional wrestling championship promoted by NWA Mid-America in and around their Tennessee and Kentucky territory from 1955 until 1974. The NWA also sanctioned the NWA World Junior Heavyweight Championship, with the United States version serving as one of several local level Junior Heavyweight Championships. Because the championship was a professional wrestling championship, it was not won or lost competitively but instead by the decision of the bookers of a wrestling promotion. The championship was awarded after the chosen wrestler "won" a match to maintain the illusion that professional wrestling is a competitive sport.

Title history
Key

Footnotes

See also
NWA World Junior Heavyweight Championship
SMW United States Junior Heavyweight Championship, revival in Smoky Mountain Wrestling

References
General

Specific

Junior heavyweight wrestling championships
National Wrestling Alliance championships
NWA Mid-America championships